Timothy Sean Mulherin  (24 August 1957 – 7 September 2020) was an Australian politician who was the MP for Mackay in the Legislative Assembly of Queensland from 1995 to 2015, serving as Deputy Leader of the Opposition from 2012 to 2015.

Early life and career
Born in Mackay, he was a clerk on the Mackay Electricity Board before becoming involved in politics.

Political career
From 1994 to 1995 he was a state organiser of the Labor Party. In 1995, he was elected to the Legislative Assembly of Queensland as the Labor member for Mackay, replacing Ed Casey, a former ALP leader. He served as a backbencher until he was named to the Beattie Ministry to replace the disgraced Gordon Nuttall as Minister for Primary Industries and Fisheries in December 2005. He was given additional responsibility for Regional Development in 2009, and his title was recast as Minister for Primary Industries, Fisheries and Rural and Regional Queensland. In February 2011, his title was again changed, this time to Minister for Agriculture, Food and Regional Economies

At the advent of the ALP's heavy defeat at the 2012 election, Mulherin barely held on to his seat of Mackay, a Labor stronghold for the better part of a century. He suffered a 16-point swing, reducing his majority from a comfortably safe 16 per cent to an extremely marginal 0.5 per cent, making it the most marginal Labor seat in the Assembly. He was one of only three Labor members elected from outside South East Queensland. Following the election, he was elected unopposed as deputy leader of what remained of Labor, and hence Deputy Opposition Leader.

During the 2015 election campaign, Mulherin announced his retirement citing family and health reasons but remained as Deputy Opposition Leader until polling day.  At the time of his retirement, he was the longest-serving Labor member of the Legislative Assembly, and the only one to have previously served in Opposition prior to 2012, having been in Parliament during the 1996–98 Coalition ministry of Rob Borbidge.

Personal life
Tim Mulherin was married to Erin and had three children, Declan, Liam and Rory. He died of cancer on 7 September 2020 at the age of 63.

After his death, in June 2022 Mulherin was posthumously appointed Member of the Order of Australia in the 2022 Queen's Birthday Honours for "significant service to the people and Parliament of Queensland".

References

1957 births
2020 deaths
Members of the Order of Australia
Members of the Queensland Legislative Assembly
People from Mackay, Queensland
Australian Labor Party members of the Parliament of Queensland
21st-century Australian politicians
Deputy opposition leaders